Ahmed Ahmed al-Maisari  is a Yemeni politician. He is the former Interior Minister of the Yemeni internationally recognized government (24 December 2017 – 18 December 2020).

He served also as deputy Prime Minister of Yemen. On 21 August 2015, al-Maisari was appointed by Yemeni president Abdrabbuh Mansur Hadi as minister of Agriculture and Irrigation.

References 

Living people
1969 births
People from Abyan Governorate
Interior ministers of Yemen
21st-century Yemeni politicians
Deputy Prime Ministers of Yemen
Agriculture ministers of Yemen
Bahah Cabinet
Bin Dagher Cabinet
First Maeen Cabinet